Quốc Thái  is a rural commune (xã) and village of the An Phú District of An Giang Province, Vietnam. It is located north by road from Châu Đốc. The main village of Quốc Thái lies along the river bank.

Communes of An Giang province
Populated places in An Giang province